Jimmy Carter is a 2002 two-part television documentary film about Jimmy Carter, the 39th President of the United States. Produced by PBS for the American Experience documentary program, it recounts Carter's life from childhood in Georgia to his post-presidency as peacemaker. The film was written, produced, and directed by Adriana Bosch, and was first aired on PBS in two parts on November 11 and 12, 2002.

Interviewees

Peter Bourne, biographer
Douglas Brinkley, historian
Pat Caddell, pollster
Chip Carter, son
Dan T. Carter, historian
Rosalynn Carter, first lady
Elizabeth Drew, journalist
Warren Fortson, lawyer
Betty Glad, political scientist
E. Stanly Godbold, historian
Hendrik Hertzberg, speechwriter
Leroy Johnson, Georgia state senator
Bert Lance, Advisor
Walter Mondale, Vice President
Andrew Young, U.N. ambassador

Home media
Jimmy Carter was first released on VHS by PBS on November 19, 2002, a week after it first aired on television. On March 7, 2006, PBS released the film on DVD. Later, it would also be included in an American Experience DVD box set collecting the program's films about United States presidents, released on August 26, 2008.

References

External links
PBS official site

2002 television films
2002 films
2002 documentary films
American Experience
American documentary television films
Documentary films about presidents of the United States
Cultural depictions of Jimmy Carter
2000s English-language films
2000s American films